Beyin is a village in the Jomoro district, a district in the Western Region of Ghana. Beyin contains the Fort Apollonia Castle.

References

Populated places in Jomoro Municipal District